The events of 1970 in anime.

Releases

Deaths

Specific date unknown
Jun'ichi Kouchi, Japanese animator, animated film director and producer (Namakura Gatana), dies at age 84.

See also
1970 in animation

External links 
Japanese animated works of the year, listed in the IMDb

Anime
Anime
Years in anime